The Ice Hockey Federation of Armenia, sometimes called the Armenian Ice Hockey Federation, is the Armenian national ice hockey federation. Its headquarters are based in Yerevan. The president, Vahram Sargsyan, is also the Chairman of the Armenian National Federation of Bandy.

History 
The Ice Hockey Federation of Armenia was established in 1999. The Armenian National Federation of Bandy is administered concurrently by President Vahram Sargsyan. The Federation is a full member of the Federation of International Bandy and an associate member of the International Ice Hockey Federation. The Federation organizes Armenia's participation in international hockey tournaments, as well as, training ice hockey athletes and coaches. The Federation conducts training from the Yerevan Figure Skating and Hockey Sports School.

Activities 
The Federation directly oversees the Armenia men's national ice hockey team, the Armenia men's national junior ice hockey team, and the Armenia men's national under-18 ice hockey team.

In October 2013, the Federation signed a cooperation agreement with the Ice Hockey Federation of Russia.

See also

 Armenian Hockey League
 Bandy
 Ice hockey in Armenia
 Ice hockey by country
 List of members of the International Ice Hockey Federation
 Sport in Armenia

References

External links
Armenia at IIHF.com
Marzig International - Armenian Ice Hockey Federation Officially licensed Merchandise

Ice hockey
Ice hockey in Armenia
Ice hockey governing bodies in Europe
Armenia
Bandy in Armenia
Federation of International Bandy members